Willard Newton Sawyer  (1864–1936) was a  left-handed pitcher in Major League Baseball. He played for the 1883 Cleveland Blues, appearing in 17 games with 15 starts. He played in the minors with Grand Rapids of the Northwestern League in 1884.  He attended Western Reserve University from 1880-1883.

External links

1864 births
1936 deaths
Major League Baseball pitchers
19th-century baseball players
Case Western Spartans baseball players
Cleveland Blues (NL) players
Grand Rapids (minor league baseball) players
Baseball players from Ohio